The 1987 Australian Swimming Championships were held at the Beatty Park Pool in Perth, Western Australia from Thursday 26 February to Sunday 1 March. They were organised by Australian Swimming.

Medal winners

Men's events

Legend:

Women's events

Legend:

References

Australian Swimming Championships
Australian Swimming Championships, 1987
Sport in Perth, Western Australia
Swim